James Bruce (born 17 June 1993) is a Zimbabwean cricketer. He made his first-class debut for Mid West Rhinos in the 2016–17 Logan Cup on 19 April 2017.

References

External links
 

1993 births
Living people
Zimbabwean cricketers
Mid West Rhinos cricketers
Sportspeople from Harare